"Why Don't You Believe Me?" is a popular song written by Lew Douglas, King Laney, and Roy Rodde and published in 1952.

A recording by Joni James (MGM Records catalog number 11333) reached No. 1 on the Billboard charts for four weeks in September 1952. Competing versions by Patti Page (Mercury Records catalog number 70025, reaching chart position No. 4) and Margaret Whiting (Capitol Records catalog number 2292, reaching chart position No. 29) also charted in 1952.  The B-side to Page's version was the well-known song "Conquest". On the Cash Box Best-Selling Record list, where all versions were combined (co-chart), the song also reached No. 1 that year.

Recorded versions
Pat Boone
Lillian Brooks
Bing Crosby sang it on four occasions on his radio show in 1953. 
Vic Damone (1965 single)
Dolly Dawn
The Duprees reached No. 37 in 1963.
Maureen Evans
The Five Crowns
Bobby Goldsboro
Claude Gray & the Graymen
Red Ingle
Joni James
Damita Jo
The Kalin Twins
Mickey Katz
Herb Lance
Brenda Lee
Wade Legge
Liane & The Boheme Bar Trio
Guy Lombardo
Joe Loss with Rose Brennan
Dean Martin
Jane Morgan
Patti Page
Norrie Paramor with Jim Allan
Jimmy Roselli
Lita Roza
Semprini, pianoforte with Rhythm accompaniment recorded it as the first song of the medley "Dancing to the piano (No. 19) - Hit medley of foxtrots" along with "Cry My Heart" and "Even Now" in London on January 14, 1953. It was released by EMI on the His Master's Voice label as catalog number B 10441
Semprini, pianoforte with Rhythm accompaniment recorded it as the first song of the medley "Dancing to the piano (No 30) - Hit Medley of foxtrots" along with "Downhearted" and "Till I Waltz Again with You" in London on March 11, 1953. The medley was released by EMI on the His Master's Voice label as catalog number B 10457
Charlie Shaffer
Sharkey and His Kings of Dixieland
Jennie Smith
Sountrac
Donna Stark (RCI Records catalog number 2341) reached No. 92 on the Billboard country music charts in 1980.
Nancy Umeki aka Miyoshi Umeki
Jerry Vale
June Valli
Bobby Vinton
Robin Ward
Lawrence Welk
Margaret Whiting
O. V. Wright
Jimmy Young

See also
List of number-one singles of 1952 (U.S.)

References

1952 songs
1952 singles
1963 singles
Number-one singles in the United States
Songs written by Lew Douglas
Songs written by Roy Rodde
Patti Page songs